This list covers all passenger railway stations and halts in Saxony-Anhalt that are used by scheduled services.

Description
The list is organised as follows:

 Name: the current name of the station or halt. 
 Urban/Rural county (Kreis): This column shows the county in which the station is located. The abbreviations used correspond to those used for German car number plates. The individual counties in Saxony-Anhalt are:

 ABI = Landkreis Anhalt-Bitterfeld
 BK = Landkreis Börde
 BLK = Burgenlandkreis
 HZ = Landkreis Harz
 JL = Landkreis Jerichower Land
 MSH = Landkreis Mansfeld-Südharz
 SAW = Altmarkkreis Salzwedel
 SDL = Landkreis Stendal
 SK = Saalekreis
 SLK = Salzlandkreis
 WB = Landkreis Wittenberg
 DE = Dessau-Roßlau
 HAL = Halle (Saale)
 MD = Magdeburg

Railway Operator (Transport Association)
This specifies the name of the Transport Association (Verkehrsverbund). The Verkehrs- und Tarifgemeinschaft Ostharz ("Transport and Fare Community of the East Harz") is active in the Harz, but only for bus and tram operations.
 The MDV (Mitteldeutscher Verkehrsverbund, "Central German Transport Association") cover the Leipzig-Halle Region and crosses the state border into Saxony.
 marego (Magdeburger Regionalverkehrsverbund, "Magdeburg Regional Transport Association") covers the north of Saxony-Anhalt. Its boundaries are in the north is the state border, in the southwest it is at Oschersleben, in the south it is at Könnern and in the east it is at Loburg.

Category
The category shows the status at 1 January 2012 and only applies to stations operated by DB Station&Service AG.

Train type
The next five columns show which types of train stop at the station. The abbreviations are those used by the DB AG but apply to similar train types of other operators:
 ICE = Intercity-Express
 IC = Intercity and Eurocity
 RE = Regionalexpress
 RB = Regionalbahn
 S = S-Bahn

Line
This column gives the railway line on which the station is situated.

Remarks 
In this column additional information is supplied, particularly with regard to the operators and seasonal services.

Station overview (standard gauge)

Stations on the Harz narrow-gauge lines

Notes

References

 

 
Saxony-Anhalt
Rail